Patrick Henry Finnegan (1927-1989) was an American ice hockey center who won a bronze medal at the 1949 World Championships.

Career
After winning the first State Championship for Eveleth High School Finnegan joined the program at Minnesota. After only a year with the Gophers, Finnegan transferred to California and performed remarkably for the Golden Bears, earning AHCA First Team All-American honors.

Finnegan would move on swiftly once more, leaving the team after 1948 to prepare for the 1949 World Championships. He played for the US National Team with legends like Charlie Holt, Jack Riley, Jack Kelley and Bruce Mather. The team swept through the preliminary round with ease, scoring 12 goals in all three games. In the first game of the final round they suffered a stunning defeat at the hands of Switzerland, whom they had defeated three days before by a score of 12–5. The team could ill afford another loss but their next opponent was Canada and the US's gold medal hopes were ended with a 7–2 loss. The team recovered with three consecutive wins, including over gold-medalist Czechoslovakia, to earn a bronze medal.

Awards and honors

References

External links
 

1927 births
1989 deaths
American men's ice hockey centers
California Golden Bears men's ice hockey players
Ice hockey players from Minnesota
Minnesota Golden Gophers men's ice hockey players
Rochester Mustangs players
Sportspeople from Eveleth, Minnesota
AHCA Division I men's ice hockey All-Americans